Jack Pyburn (born December 28, 1944) is a former American football tackle. He played for the Miami Dolphins from 1967 to 1968.

References

1944 births
Living people
American football tackles
Texas A&M Aggies football players
Miami Dolphins players